Eguchi (written: 江口) is a Japanese surname. Notable people with the surname include:

Akira Eguchi, pianist
, Japanese table tennis player
Hisashi Eguchi, manga artist
Katsuya Eguchi, video game designer
Takahito Eguchi, video game composer
Takuya Eguchi, voice actor
Yoshinori (Yazo) Eguchi, of Kyushin Ryu Jujutsu
Yōsuke Eguchi, actor

See also
Eguchi (play), a Noh play
Eguchi Station, train station in Higashimiyoshi

Japanese-language surnames